Camp Intermission, also known as William Morris House, is a historic Great Camp located on Lake Colby just outside the village of Saranac Lake in the town of Harrietstown, Franklin County, New York.  It was built in 1928 for theatrical agent William Morris, designed by William G. Distin.  The property includes the main house and seven contributing outbuildings.  The house is a -story, rectangular wood and stone dwelling with a rear kitchen wing.  The house features elaborately patterned stone arches and sills and a "cure porch."  The outbuildings include a wood shed, machine shed housing a wood cutter, wellhouse, root cellar, ice house, barn, and a caretaker's house.

It was listed on the National Register of Historic Places in 1992.

References

Houses on the National Register of Historic Places in New York (state)
Houses completed in 1928
Houses in Franklin County, New York
American Craftsman architecture in New York (state)
National Register of Historic Places in Franklin County, New York